Moritz Wels (born 25 September 2004) is an Austrian professional footballer who plays for Sturm Graz.

Club career 
Having played with Sturm Graz since the under-12, Moritz Wels made his professional debut for The Blackies on 27 October 2021, coming on as a substitute during a Cup game against SV Ried. Having then become the youngest player to ever play for the club, he signed his first professional contract a few days after.

The following week, Wels played his first Europa League game, replacing Anderson Niangbo during a 1–1 away draw against Real Sociedad, becoming the youngest Austrian to ever play in the competition, surpassing Yusuf Demir's previous record.

He made his Austrian Football Bundesliga debut on the 27 February 2022, replacing Alexander Prass during a 3–0 home win against TSV Hartberg.

Having fully become part of the professional squad during the 2022 pre-season, he took part in the Champions League qualifications games against Dynamo Kyiv, as the club from Graz only failed to advance after extra-time.

International career 
Moritz Wels is a youth international for Austria, being part of all the Austrian selections up until the under-18, with whom he became a regular goalscorer, most notably netting a double against Sweden in October 2021.

References

External links

2004 births
Living people
Austrian footballers
Austria youth international footballers
Association football midfielders
SK Sturm Graz players
Austrian Regionalliga players
Austrian Football Bundesliga players